Adriana Rozwadowska is a Polish journalist, specializing in the issues of the job market, labour law and social policy. She has worked as a presenter at the German Rundfunk Berlin-Brandenburg television, and since 2015 has worked at the Gazeta Wyborcza daily newspaper. Since 2021 she is also the president of the Solidarity trade union at Agora, the newspaper's publisher.

References

Polish journalists
Solidarity (Polish trade union) activists
Polish women journalists
21st-century Polish journalists
Polish television presenters
Year of birth missing (living people)
Living people